S.S. Lazio finished in second place in Serie A this season and reached the quarter final of the UEFA Cup.

Squad

Transfers

Winter

Serie A

League table

Results by round

Matches

Statistics

Players statistics

Top scorers
  Giuseppe Signori 17 (3)
  Pierluigi Casiraghi 11 (1)
  Alen Bokšić 9
  Diego Fuser 5
  Aron Winter 5

References

S.S. Lazio seasons
Lazio